Vladimir "Vova" Tămaș (born 3 August 1971) is a Romanian former professional footballer who played as a defender for Înfrățirea Oradea and FC Bihor Oradea. Tămaș played in 216 Divizia A matches and scored 16 goals for FC Bihor, being the captain of the team in one of its greatest times. After retirement Tămaș was involved in FC Bihor as a sporting director and general manager. He is currently included in the hall of fame of the football club based in Oradea, being considered a legend.

Honours
Bihor Oradea
Divizia B: 1987–88

References

1961 births
Living people
Sportspeople from Oradea
Romanian footballers
Association football defenders
Liga I players
Liga II players
FC Bihor Oradea players